Rod outer segment membrane protein 1 is a protein that in humans is encoded by the ROM1 gene.

This gene is a member of a photoreceptor-specific gene family and encodes an integral membrane protein found in the photoreceptor disk rim of the eye. This protein can form homodimers or can heterodimerize with another photoreceptor protein, peripherin-2 (PRPH2; retinal degeneration, slow; RDS). It is essential for disk morphogenesis, and may also function as an adhesion molecule involved in the stabilization and compaction of outer segment disks or in the maintenance of the curvature of the rim. Certain defects in this gene have been associated with the degenerative eye disease retinitis pigmentosa.

References

Further reading